Jeremy Juliusz Sochan (born May 20, 2003) is a Polish-American professional basketball player for the San Antonio Spurs of the National Basketball Association (NBA). Nicknamed "The Destroyer", he is also a member of Poland men's national basketball team. He played college basketball for the Baylor Bears. He played in England for a number of years as a youth.

Early life and career
Sochan was born in the United States, in Guymon, Oklahoma. His mother Aneta was a Polish basketball player for Polonia Warsaw who played Division II college basketball at Panhandle State. While there, she met Sochan's father, Ryan Williams who played for the men's basketball team. Sochan comes from a family with rich sporting traditions. His grandfather Juliusz Sochan, after whom he received his middle name, was a director of the basketball section of AZS AWF Warsaw and the president of the Warsaw Regional Basketball Association, his great-grandfather Zygmunt Sochan was a football player for Warszawianka, making 94 appearances in the Ekstraklasa (Polish top division) before World War II, when he joined the Polish resistance against the German occupiers and was Stutthof concentration camp survivor.

Sochan took his first steps in basketball while living in England, first as a youth for the MK Trojans in Milton Keynes, before moving to Southampton and playing for the Solent Kestrels youth team and Itchen College.

Sochan began his high school career at La Lumiere School in Indiana, but due to the COVID-19 pandemic, he left America.

Sochan committed to playing college basketball for Baylor in July 2020.

College career
On January 8, 2022, Sochan sprained his ankle during a game against TCU and missed several games. Following the season, he earned the Big 12 Sixth Man Award and was named to the Big 12 All-Freshman Team. His team would later get a #1 seed in the 2022 NCAA Division I men's basketball tournament, but lose in the second round. As a freshman, he averaged 9.2 points, 6.4 rebounds and 1.3 steals per game. On April 15, 2022, Sochan declared for the 2022 NBA draft, forgoing his remaining college eligibility.

Professional career

Solent Kestrels (2019-2020)

At the age of 16, Sochan started his professional career for the Solent Kestrels of the National Basketball League.

OrangeAcademy (2020–2021)
In 2020, Sochan joined the German club OrangeAcademy of the ProB.

San Antonio Spurs (2022–present)
Sochan was selected by the San Antonio Spurs with the ninth overall pick in the 2022 NBA Draft. Sochan joined the Spurs' roster in the 2022 NBA Summer League, but later was ruled out after being placed in the NBA's Health and Safety Protocol after testing positive for coronavirus. 

On July 8, 2022, Sochan signed a rookie-scale contract with the Spurs. On December 22, Sochan scored a then career-high 23 points and grabbed nine rebounds in a 126–117 loss to the New Orleans Pelicans. On January 28, 2023, Sochan scored a career-high 30 points in a 128–118 loss to the Phoenix Suns.

National team career
Sochan had represented both Poland and England nationally at the junior level. As part of Poland's under-16 national basketball team, he led his team to the title at the 2019 FIBA U16 European Championship Division B in Montenegro. There, he became tournament MVP.

Sochan has been a member of the Polish national basketball team. In his first game at the EuroBasket 2022 qualification, he led Poland over Romania 88–81 when he became the youngest player to ever play for Poland. He played 29 minutes in which he scored 18 points, including a four-point play (3 pointer plus foul and free throw) at the end and a game-deciding block.

Career statistics

College

|-
| style="text-align:left;"|2021–22
| style="text-align:left;"|Baylor
| 30 || 1 || 25.1 || .474 || .296 || .589 || 6.4 || 1.8 || 1.3 || .7 || 9.2

References

External links

 Baylor Bears bio

2003 births
Living people
American men's basketball players
American people of Polish descent
Basketball players from Oklahoma
Baylor Bears men's basketball players
Citizens of Poland through descent
La Lumiere School alumni
People from Guymon, Oklahoma
American expatriate basketball people in Germany
Polish expatriate basketball people in Germany
Polish men's basketball players
Polish people of American descent
San Antonio Spurs draft picks
San Antonio Spurs players
Small forwards